This article shows the rosters of all participating teams at the 2019 FIBA Under-19 Women's Basketball World Cup in Thailand.

Group C

Australia
</noinclude>

<noinclude>

United States

References

External links
Official website

2019
Basketball squads